The Principles for Social Investment is an initiative of the United Nations Global Compact to provide an ethical foundation and guidelines for social investment by companies and their foundations, community foundations and private foundations and thereby encourage an integrated, strategic and sustainable approach to improve long-term "returns" to key stakeholders – including populations benefiting from social investment and the investors. Its secretariat is based in Melbourne, Australia.

The United Nations Global Compact Principles for Social Investment (PSI) promote contributions that are purposeful, accountable, respectful, and ethical.
Social Investment may be defined as the tangible/intangible resource input in any society that can bring about a social change

External links
 Principles for Social Investment

United Nations organizations based in Oceania
Australia and the United Nations